Gillingham may refer to:

Places

United Kingdom
 Gillingham, Dorset
 Gillingham railway station (Dorset)
 Gillingham School, a coeducational school situated in Gillingham in North Dorset, England
 Gillingham Town F.C., a football club
 Gillingham (liberty), a former administrative division
 Gillingham, Kent
 Gillingham and Rainham (UK Parliament constituency), existing since 2010
 Gillingham (UK Parliament constituency), existed from 1918 to 2010
 Gillingham EMU depot, a train maintenance
 Fort Gillingham, a former fort
 Gillingham railway station (Kent)
Gillingham F.C., football club
 Gillingham, Norfolk

United States
 Gillingham, Wisconsin

People
 Gillingham (surname)

See also 
 Gillingham F.C. players (1–24 appearances)
 Gillingham F.C. players (25–49 appearances)